Subscapular nerves can refer to: 
 Upper subscapular nerve
 Thoracodorsal nerve (middle subscapular nerve)
 Lower subscapular nerve

The subscapular nerves originate from the posterior cord of the brachial plexus. These nerves are part of a group of nerves that innervate the muscles that move the scapula. The upper subscapular nerve innervates the upper portion of the subscapularis muscle. The middle subscapular nerve, known as the thoracodorsal nerve, innervates the latissimus dorsi muscle.
The lower subscapular nerve contains two branches. One branch inserts into the lower portion of the subscapularis muscle and the other branch inserts into the teres major. In some individuals, accessory upper subscapular nerve or accessory lower subscapular nerve may be found.

References

External links 
 https://www.wheelessonline.com/joints/subscapular-nerve/

Nerves of the upper limb